Richard W. Holub (October 29, 1921 – July 27, 2009) was an American basketball player and coach.

A 6'6" center born in Racine, Wisconsin, Holub played college basketball at Long Island University, and was a member of an NIT championship team in 1941. His college career was interrupted by a stint with the Air Force during World War II, but he returned to school in 1946, and led his team in scoring during the 1946–47 season.

After being drafted by the New York Knicks in the 1947 BAA draft, Holub spent the 1947–48 season with the team, then embarked upon a seventeen-year coaching career at Farleigh Dickinson University. During his tenure as coach, he achieved a 233–167 record. He also taught English at Farleigh Dickinson. In 1981, he became an academic adviser for the University of Connecticut's athletic department.

Holub died on July 27, 2009, in Sun City West, Arizona.

BAA career statistics

Regular season

References

External links
 

1921 births
2009 deaths
All-American college men's basketball players
American men's basketball players
Basketball coaches from New York (state)
Basketball coaches from Wisconsin
Basketball players from New York (state)
Basketball players from Wisconsin
Centers (basketball)
College men's basketball head coaches in the United States
Fairleigh Dickinson Knights men's basketball coaches
LIU Brooklyn Blackbirds men's basketball players
New York Knicks draft picks
New York Knicks players
Paterson Crescents players
People from Sun City West, Arizona
Sportspeople from Racine, Wisconsin
Sportspeople from the Phoenix metropolitan area